Antoniny (Antonin) (formerly known as Holodky and Antonyny is an urban-type settlement in Khmelnytskyi Raion (district) of Khmelnytskyi Oblast (province) in western Ukraine. It hosts the administration of Antoniny settlement hromada, one of the hromadas of Ukraine. The settlement's population was 2,655 as of the 2001 Ukrainian Census and 

In the 1870s a Neo-baroque palace was built in Antoniny by Austrian architects Fellner & Helmer for the noble Sanguszko and Potocki families. However, it was burned to the ground in a fire set by Bolsheviks in August 1919, and only the palace service buildings remain.

In February 1930 the village was the centre of a quickly defeated anti-Soviet Union revolt.

Until 18 July 2020, Antoniny belonged to Krasyliv Raion. The raion was abolished in July 2020 as part of the administrative reform of Ukraine, which reduced the number of raions of Khmelnytskyi Oblast to three. The area of Krasyliv Raion was merged into Khmelnytskyi Raion.

People from Antoniny
 Anton Leontyuk (1918-1994), Hero of the Soviet Union

References

External links
 The murder of the Jews of Antoniny during World War II, at Yad Vashem website.

Urban-type settlements in Khmelnytskyi Raion
Populated places established in the 14th century
Zaslavsky Uyezd
Holocaust locations in Ukraine